The 2011 African Women's Handball Champions League was the 33rd edition, organized by the African Handball Confederation, under the auspices of the International Handball Federation, the handball sport governing body. The tournament was held from October 21–30 in Kaduna, Nigeria, contested by 9 teams and won by Atlético Petróleos de Luanda of Angola.

Draw

Preliminary round

Times given below are in WAT UTC+1.

Group A

* Note:  Advance to semi-finals qualification Relegated to 7-9th classification

Group B

* Note:  Advance to semi-finals qualification Relegated to 7-9th classification

Group C

* Note:  Advance to semi-finals qualification Relegated to 7-9th classification

Semifinals qualification - Group D1

* Note:  Advance to semi-finals Relegated to 5th place classification

Semifinals qualification - Group D2

* Note:  Advance to semi-finals Relegated to 5th place classification

Knockout stage
Championship bracket

5th place

7–9th classification

Final ranking

See also
 2014 African Handball Championship

References

External links
 Official website

African Women's Handball Champions League
African Women's Handball Champions League
African Women's Handball Champions League
2011 Africa Women's Handball Champions League
International handball competitions hosted by Nigeria